Arthur "Dooley" Wilson (April 3, 1886 – May 30, 1953) was an American actor, singer and musician who is best remembered for his portrayal of Sam in the 1942 film Casablanca. In that romantic drama, he performs its theme song "As Time Goes By".

Wilson was a drummer and singer who led his own band in the 1920s, touring nightclubs in London and Paris. In the 1930s he took up acting, playing supporting roles onstage on Broadway and in a series of modest films. His role in Casablanca was by far his most prominent, but his other films included My Favorite Blonde (1942) with Bob Hope, Stormy Weather (1943) with Lena Horne and the Nicholas Brothers, and the Western Passage West (1951).

Early life and career

Arthur Wilson was born in Tyler, Texas, the youngest of five children. At age seven, the year of his father's death, he began to earn a living by performing in churches in Tyler. When he was eight years old he was earning $18 a week, singing and playing in tent shows. By 1908 he was in Chicago in the repertory company of the Pekin Theatre, the first legitimate black theatre in the United States. By then he had earned the nickname "Dooley", for his whiteface impersonation of an Irishman singing a song called "Mr. Dooley".

Part of the emerging African American theatre scene, Wilson worked with the Anita Bush company in New York City in 1914 and with Charles Gilpin's stock company at the Lafayette Theatre in Harlem in 1915. He performed in James Reese Europe's band, and after World War I he toured Europe with his own band, The Red Devils, throughout the 1920s.

Working in the U.S. again during the Great Depression, Wilson starred in Conjur' Man Dies (1936) and other plays for the Federal Theatre Project's Negro Theatre Unit, then under the direction of John Houseman. His breakthrough role came in 1940, with his portrayal of Little Joe in the Broadway musical Cabin in the Sky. This won him a contract with Paramount Pictures in Hollywood. He found himself playing Pullman porters while his stage role in the MGM film adaptation of Cabin in the Sky was played by Eddie "Rochester" Anderson.

Casablanca

In May 1942, Warner Bros. was casting its production of Casablanca and borrowed Wilson from Paramount Pictures for seven weeks at $500 a week. Per the studio custom of the day, Wilson received his contract salary, $350 per week, and Paramount kept the balance.

Wilson was cast in the role of Sam, a singer and pianist employed by nightclub owner Rick (Humphrey Bogart). Wilson performs the Herman Hupfeld song "As Time Goes By", a continuing musical and emotional motif throughout the film. According to Aljean Harmetz, Variety singled out Wilson for the effectiveness of the song, and The Hollywood Reporter said he created "something joyous". The phrase "Play it again, Sam", commonly believed to be a quote from the film, is never heard in Casablanca. The line was, "Play it, once, Sam." In the film, Wilson as Sam performs several other songs for the cafe audience: "It Had To Be You", "Shine", "Knock on Wood", "Avalon" and "Parlez-moi d'amour".

Wilson was a singer and drummer, but not a pianist. The piano music for the film was played off-screen, either by Elliot Carpenter or Jean Plummer, and dubbed.

Later life and career
Wilson was cast in the film version of Stormy Weather (1943), as Gabe Tucker, the best friend of Bill Williamson (Bill "Bojangles" Robinson). It was the second all-black cast motion picture made by a major studio in the 1940s, after Cabin in the Sky.

Back on Broadway, Wilson played Pompey, an escaped slave, in the musical Bloomer Girl (1944–46). His performance of the song "The Eagle and Me" in this show was selected by Dwight Blocker Bowers for inclusion in a Smithsonian recordings compilation, American Musical Theatre. Later, Wilson played the role of Bill Jackson on the television situation comedy Beulah during its 1951–52 season. Wilson was on the executive board of the Negro Actors Guild of America.

Death and legacy
Wilson died May 30, 1953 of natural causes at his home in Los Angeles. He had become ill two years earlier while performing in a New York stage production of Harvey.  He is buried at the Rosedale Cemetery in Los Angeles. He was survived by his wife, Estelle (née Williams).

In January 2017, Wilson's hometown of Tyler, Texas dedicated a memorial marker to him on its Half Mile of History.

Filmography

References

External links

 
 
 
 
 
 

African-American male actors
American male film actors
American male stage actors
African-American drummers
Paramount Pictures contract players
1886 births
1953 deaths
Male actors from Texas
Musicians from Texas
Burials at Angelus-Rosedale Cemetery
People from Tyler, Texas
20th-century American male actors
Federal Theatre Project people
20th-century American drummers
American male drummers
20th-century African-American male singers